Green NCAP is a green vehicle assessment programme hosted and supported by the New Car Assessment Program in cooperation with European Governments. The Organisation has test laboratories in eight European countries and aims to increase awareness of the environmental impact of the vehicles. The first set of results was released on 28 February 2019. 

, the organisation considers only energy used while driving, however it plans to expand testing procedures further, in order to cover the entire life-cycle of the car as well as the range of the electric vehicles.

Testing Procedure
Test is divided into two major stages. In total an equivalent five WLTP tests are conducted.

The second part includes road testing with portable emissions measurement system which adheres to the further expanded European Union's Real Driving Emissions.

Scoring
Scoring is divided into Overall Rating – between 0 and 5 stars – and two major groups: Clean Air Index and Energy Efficiency Index.

Clean Air Index covers air pollutant emissions for unburnt hydrocarbons (HC), carbon monoxide (CO), nitrogen oxides and particulates (PN) for each for the Laboratory Tests as well as the Road test.

Energy Efficiency Index covers energy efficiency of the entire vehicle, including aerodynamic drag, tyre friction or its mass. For even comparison with electric vehicles, fuel consumption is converted into kWh using calorific value.

Green NCAP additionally tests greenhouse gas emissions, however they are not a part of the rating.

Life Cycle Assessment
In April 2022 Green NCAP published their first Life Cycle Assessment of 61 European cars, estimating the  emissions and primary energy demand associated with the car's production, usage and recycling.

Various news outlets reported on the results showing that larger electric vehicles could have life cycle emissions similar to or greater than internal combustion-engined vehicles or hybrids. However, several assumptions made by the study, and by the tool by Joanneum Research used in the study, have been criticised. These allegedly include using outdated emissions estimates on battery production, overly high production emissions for electric vehicles, and unrealistic tests for energy use. 

The battery production emission estimates were reviewed by Joanneum Research and could be traced back to a problem with a data interface, and clarifications on the testing procedures were provided by Green NCAP.

In December 2022 Green NCAP published an interactive "Life Cycle Assessment (LCA) Tool for Consumers", allowing to compare LCA values of different cars in relation to their country, energy mix and usage.

References

External links

New Car Assessment Programs
Consumer organisations in Belgium
Green vehicles
2019 in transport